Centaureidin is an O-methylated flavonol. It can be isolated from Tanacetum microphyllum, Achillea millefolium, Brickellia veronicaefolia, Bidens pilosa and Polymnia fruticosa.

References 

O-methylated flavonols
Flavonoids found in Asteraceae